Hawksy Walksy is a flat plain located in Harney County, Oregon, United States. Its elevation above sea level is 1715 meters.

References

Landforms of Harney County, Oregon